Flora Adams Darling (July 25, 1840 – January 6, 1910) was an American author. She is primarily noted for playing a role in founding the Daughters of the American Revolution in 1890.

Early years and education
She was born Sophronia A. Adams in Lancaster, New Hampshire, the fifth of eleven children of Harvey Adams, a member of the Adams political family, and his second wife Nancy Dustin Adams, née Rowell.  She is still listed as "Fronia Adams" on the 1860 census, and was living in Lancaster with her family at age nineteen.  At some point after this, she changed her name to Flora.

She was educated at Lancaster and Sanbornton.

Career
In later life, she claimed to have been married in New York City on March 12, 1860, to Edward Irving Darling on March 12, 1860, a man 22 years her senior.

More likely, the marriage, if it did take place, occurred later.  Though she described her husband variously as a Confederate colonel and from Louisiana and Kentucky, neither has any record of him among its officers, nor does the index of Confederate soldiers in the National Archives.  The couple had an only son, Edward Irving Darling, Jr., born October 9, 1862.  She maintained that her husband died December 2, 1863, from wounds received on November 29 at the first Battle of Franklin, Tennessee; where she claims that Edward was serving as a brigadier-general in the Confederate Army. Flora then attempted to travel north to her home and son under a flag of truce, but was taken by the Federals as a prisoner of war. Later, following an appeal lasting 30 years, she won a case against the Federal government for false imprisonment and theft of her possessions, and was awarded $5,683.

Despite growing increasingly deaf following the war, Flora became a prolific writer who was published in magazines and journals, and wrote a number of novels and short stories. In 1886, based on the merits of her writing, she was granted an honorary A.M. from Western Maryland College. She was also awarded an honorary degree from the Kentucky Military Institute.

She lived in Washington, D. C. for forty years, where she was socially active and developed an interest in founding patriotic societies. Flora played a role in founding the Daughters of the American Revolution on October 11, 1890, although the society does not recognize her as one of its founders. She then founded the General Society of Daughters of the Revolution on June 18, 1891, and the National Society, United States Daughters of 1812 on January 8, 1892. Each society was founded in turn because of disagreements she held with members of the previous organization.

In 1910, while visiting her brother in New York City, she died of apoplexy. Female members of the National Society, United States Daughters of 1812 between the age of 18 to 35 are termed "Flora Adams Darling Daughters" in her memory.

Works
 1607–1907. Memories of Virginia; a souvenir of founding days (1907)
 Founding and organization of the Daughters of the American Revolution and Daughters of the Revolution (1901)
 The Senator's Daughter (1892)
 From Two Points of View (1892)
 A Social Diplomat (1891)
 Was it a Just Verdict? (1890)
 The Bourbon Lily (1890)
 A winning, wayward woman: Chapters in the heart-history of Amélie Warden (1889)
 Mrs. Darling's Letters, or Memoirs of the Civil War, A Social Diplomat (1884)

References

External links
 
 
 
 
 

1840 births
1910 deaths
American women writers
Adams political family
Wikipedia articles incorporating text from A Woman of the Century